Obara may refer to:

People

With the surname
 Daisuke Obara (born 1981), Japanese ice hockey player
 Hitomi Obara (born 1981), Japanese sport wrestler
 Joji Obara, Korean-Japanese serial rapist
 Keita Obara, (born 1986), Japanese professional boxer
 Kuniyoshi Obara (1887–1977), Japanese educational theorist and publisher
 Maciej Obara (born 1981), Polish jazz musician, composer and bandleader
 Masakazu Obara, Japanese anime director
 Tadashi Obara (born 1983), Japanese speed skater
 Takumi Obara (born 1967), Japanese triathlete
 Yuri Obara (born 1980), Japanese speed skater
 Yuria Obara (born 1990), Japanese women's footballer

Fictional
 Obara Sand, a character in A Song of Ice and Fire
 Nne Obara, a character in Hitman (2016 video game)

Places
 Obara, Aichi, Japan, a former village
 Obara Station, a train station in Misaki, Okayama, Japan
 Ōbara Station, a HRT station in Hiroshima, Japan

Other uses
 Obara (stew), a Slovene national dish

See also
 Obaro (disambiguation)

Japanese-language surnames